= Kanana (film) =

1992 Ghanaian film

- Directed by: Kofi Yirenkyi
- Starring: Kwaku Crankson
- Release date: 1992
- Country: Ghana

Kanana, also known as Akata and Akatsa, is a 1992 Ghanaian movie produced and written by Kofi Yirenkyi. The film features BK Afandoh as Agya Ntow and Kwaku Crankson as Osuo Abrobuo.

== Plot ==
Akata and Akatsa are two friends who were banished from their village for stealing food items. They came across a village that was being terrorized by Sebrebe. They helped the villagers, including the women, by killing Sebrebe. However, after the community took Sebrebe's gold, Akata and Akatsa ended up stealing it, leaving the women in the village empty-handed.

== Cast ==
- Benjamin Kojo Afandoh (Agya Ntow)
- Kwaku Crankson (Osuo Abrobuo)
- Benjamin Osei Boakye
- Agnes Dampaah
- Belinda Kobina
- Comfort Takyi
- Cecelia Adjei
- Asabea Tetetsu
- Seth G. Abokyi
- Yaw Atta
- Pamela Karikari
- Kofi Yerenkyi Jnr
